Alpu Dam is a dam in Tokat Province, Turkey, built between 1998 and 2002.

See also
List of dams and reservoirs in Turkey

External links
Alpu Dam at DSI website
Dams in Tokat Province at DSİ website

Dams in Tokat Province
Dams completed in 2002
2002 establishments in Turkey